The François Chalais Prize (French: Prix François Chalais) is awarded at two main events, the Cannes Film Festival (since 1997) and the Young Reporters' Awards (since 1999). It was created to pay tribute to French journalist and film historian François Chalais, under the auspices of his wife Mei Chen.  It rewards a film dedicated to the values of life affirmation and of journalism, and highlights the presence of journalists at Cannes itself. It has also offered awards for the Film Festival of Sarlat (2006–2009), and for the Scénario Honfleur (2006–2009). The François Chalais Prize was created in 1996 by his wife Mei-Chen Chalais to pay tribute to the work of the great reporter and film-maker who covered nearly fifty editions of the Festival. It is awarded each year on the eve of the official competition and rewards a film dedicated to the values of journalism.

Cannes Film Festival Prize winners
 2022: Boy from Heaven
 2021: A Hero
 2019: A Hidden Life
 2018: Yomeddine
 2017: BPM (Beats per Minute)
 2016: The Student
 2015: Son of Saul
 2014: Timbuktu
 2013: Grand Central
 2012: Horses of God
 2011: Where Do We Go Now?
 2010: Life, Above All
 2009: No One Knows About Persian Cats
 2008: Wild Blood
 2007: A Mighty Heart
 2006: Babel
 2005: Once You're Born You Can No Longer Hide
 2004: The Motorcycle Diaries
 2003: S-21: The Khmer Rouge Killing Machine
 2002: Marooned in Iraq
 2001: Made in the USA
 2000: Kippur
 1999: The Other
 1998: West Beirut
 1997: The Perfect Circle

References

External links 
 Association François Chalais

Cannes Film Festival
Lists of films by award
French film awards
Awards established in 1997